Nawaraj Parajuli is a Nepalese poet. He is best known for popularizing the slam poetry genre in Nepal.

In 2017, a collection of his poems titled Sagarmatha Ko Gahirai was published. His anthology of poetry Sagarmatha ko Gahirai was awarded the 2017 Padmashree Award by the Khemkala-Harikala Lamichhane Foundation. Sagarmatha ko Gahirahi was also nominated for the Madan Puraskar award.

Biography 
He was born to father Hari Prasad Parajuli and mother Laxmi Devi Parajuli in 1987 in Jhapa, Nepal. He received an M.Ed. in English Education from Tribhuvan University.

Concert tours
Parajauli went on a six-city tour of Australia in 2017, accompanied by flutist Samyak Maharjan, guitarist Chet Pun and poet Shuvechchhya Pradhan. At the event in Sydney, the organisers also honoured his contributions to Nepali language and literature. He went on a poetry tour of the United Kingdom in 2018, to support children who were affected during the Nepalese Civil War.

Acting 
He acted in the play Malini when it toured Europe in 2017, along with Rajendra Shrestha, Sujan Oli, Dipesh Rai, Jeni Subedi, Dilip Ranabhat and Bipul Pandey .

Books 

 Sagarmatha Ko Gahirai (2017)

Awards and recognition
 Winner, Nepal Slam Poetry 2014
 Padmashree Sahitya Puraskar for Sagarmatha ko Gahirai

References

Nepalese male poets
Living people
21st-century Nepalese poets
People of the Nepalese Civil War
People from Jhapa District
Nepalese poets
Padmashree Sahitya Puraskar winners
1987 births